Bhote Namlang is a former Village Development Committee and now a village in Sindhupalchok District in the Bagmati Zone of central Nepal. At the time of the 1991 Nepal census, it had a population of 2867 and had 579 houses in the village  and at 2001

References

Populated places in Sindhupalchowk District